João Carlos Brenha Alves Pereira (born May 6, 1970 in Espinho) is a beach volleyball player from Portugal, who competed in three consecutive Summer Olympics for his native country, starting in 1996. He ended up in fourth place in Atlanta (1996) and Sydney (2000), alongside Miguel Maia, after having lost the bronze medal match against the German couple Axel Hager / Jörg Ahmann.

Playing Partners
Miguel Maia

References
 Profile

1970 births
Living people
Beach volleyball players at the 1996 Summer Olympics
Beach volleyball players at the 2000 Summer Olympics
Beach volleyball players at the 2004 Summer Olympics
Portuguese beach volleyball players
Olympic beach volleyball players of Portugal
People from Espinho, Portugal
Sportspeople from Aveiro District